The men's 81 kg judo event at the 2015 European Games in Baku was held on 26 June at the Heydar Aliyev Arena.

Results

Finals

Repechage

Pool A

Pool B

Pool C

Pool D

References

External links
 
 

M81
2015